Top Naeff (1878-1953) was a Dutch writer.

Life
Top Naeff, the only child of strict parents, did not excel at secondary school. She married a family doctor, but later fell passionately in love with the director and actor Willem Royaards. Royaards, also married, did not reciprocate in the way she wanted.

Naeff's first novel, School Idylls (1900), told the story of a teenage orphan, Jet van Marle, brought up by a loveless aunt and uncle. The novel was inspired by Louisa M. Alcott and Tine van Berken. In her first adult novel, At the Gate (1912), the protagonist Liesbeth van Landschot is frustrated by her violent passion for a man who is unaware of her feelings.

Naeff reviewed plays widely for De Groene Amsterdammer. She succeeded her friend Herman Robbers as editor of Elsevier's Geïllustreerd Maandschrift (Elsevier's Illustrated Monthly).

Works
 Schoolidyllen [School Idylls], 1900
 Oogst, 1900
 De tweelingen, 1901
 't Veulen, 1903
 De dochter, 1904
 In den dop, 1906
 De stille getuige, 1906
 Voor de poort [At the Gate], 1912
 Vriendin, 1920
 Charlotte von Stein: een episode, 1921
 Voorbijgangers: vier verhalen, 1925
 Voorbijgangers, 1925
 Letje, of De weg naar het geluk, 1926
 Klein avontuur, 1928
 Offers ... [Sacrifices...], 1932
 Een huis in de rij [The Terraced House], 1935
 Juffrouw Stolk, en andere verhalen, 1936
 Willem Royaards: de tooneelkunstenaar in zijn tijd, 1947
 Zo was het ongeveer, 1951

References

1878 births
1953 deaths
Dutch novelists
Dutch journalists
Dutch children's writers
Dutch women children's writers